Heart of Stone is an East German fantasy film directed by Paul Verhoeven. The first East German film made in Agfacolor, it was released in 1950. The film is based on the fairy tale of the same name originally published by Wilhelm Hauff in 1826.

Plot
Peter, a woodsman and his mother live in the Black Forest where he exists by selling charcoal.  Stung by the ridicule of the wealthier inhabitants of the village and desiring to marry the beautiful Lisbeth, he sees his only chance for prosperity by locating a good forest spirit, the small Glasmännlein  who grants him two wishes at first, then a third wish later.  Peter wishes for wealth that he purchases a glassworks but due to his inexperience the glassworks fails and he gambles his money away.

Unable to marry Lisbeth due to his being pursued by creditors, Peter locates a dark forest spirit, Holländer-Michel, to make more wishes for wealth.  Holländer-Michel agrees to grant him wealth, but only in exchange for his heart that Holländer-Michel replaces with one made of stone. Holländer-Michel shows that the wealthier inhabitants of the village already have done so and shows Peter their hearts that he displays on the wall.  Peter agrees and becomes a ruthlessly successful businessman but at the cost of Lisbeth and his happiness.

Cast

Reception
The film is one of the most successful DEFA pictures of all time, and sold 9,779,526 tickets in East Germany.

References

External links
 

1950 films
1950s children's fantasy films
German children's fantasy films
East German films
1950s German-language films
Films directed by Paul Verhoeven (Germany)
Films based on works by Wilhelm Hauff
Films based on short fiction
Films set in the 18th century
Films about wish fulfillment
Films set in the Black Forest
Films_based_on_fairy_tales
1950s German films
Films about businesspeople